Ñawpallaqta or Ñawpa Llaqta (Quechua  ñawpa ancient, llaqta place (village, town, city, country, nation), "ancient place", also spelled Ñaupallacta, Ñaupallaqta) is an archaeological site in Peru on top of a mountain of that name. It lies in the Ayacucho Region, Lucanas Province, San Cristóbal District. It is situated near the archaeological site of Puka Urqu, southeast of it.

References 

Archaeological sites in Peru
Archaeological sites in Ayacucho Region
Mountains of Peru
Mountains of Ayacucho Region